The Roman Catholic Diocese of Sanyuan is a diocese located in Sanyuan in the Ecclesiastical province of Xi'an, and is centered in the Chinese province of Shaanxi.

History
 November 1, 1931: Established as Apostolic Prefecture of Sanyuan from the Apostolic Vicariate of Xi’anfu
 July 13, 1944: Promoted as Apostolic Vicariate of Sanyuan
 April 11, 1946: Promoted as Diocese of Sanyuan

Leadership
 Bishops of Sanyuan (Roman rite)
 Bishop Joseph Han Yingjin (since June 24, 2010)
 Bishop John Chrysostom Lan Shi (2003–2008)
 Bishop John Bai Ningxian (since May 7, 1997) (possibly an auxiliary bishop)
 Bishop Joseph Zong Huaide (1985–2003)
 Bishop Ferdinando Fulgenzio Pasini, O.F.M. (April 11, 1946–April 17, 1985)
 Vicars Apostolic of Sanyuan (Roman Rite)
 Bishop Ferdinando Fulgenzio Pasini, O.F.M. (July 13, 1944–April 11, 1946)
 Prefects Apostolic of Sanyuan (Roman Rite)
 Fr. Ferdinando Fulgenzio Pasini, O.F.M. (later Bishop) (June 4, 1932–July 13, 1944)

References

 GCatholic.org
 Catholic Hierarchy
 UCAN Diocese Profile
 Fourth China bishop ordained this year, ucanews, June 24, 2010

Roman Catholic dioceses in China
Christian organizations established in 1931
Roman Catholic dioceses and prelatures established in the 20th century
1931 establishments in China
Christianity in Shaanxi
Xianyang